}}

The 1998 Wisconsin gubernatorial election was held on November 3, 1998. Incumbent Governor Tommy Thompson won re-election for the third time with nearly 60% of the vote. To date, this is most recent gubernatorial election in which Milwaukee County voted for the Republican candidate, and the most recent where the winner garnered a double digit margin of victory. Gary George unsuccessfully sought the Democratic nomination.

Results

See also
 1998 United States Senate election in Wisconsin
 1998 United States gubernatorial elections

References 

1998 Wisconsin elections
Wisconsin gubernatorial elections
Wisconsin